8 Seconds is the soundtrack to the movie 8 Seconds. It was released in 1994 by MCA Records. The album peaked at no. 3 on the Billboard Top Country Albums chart.

Content
Four cuts from the album made the Hot Country Songs charts: McBride & the Ride's "No More Cryin'" at no. 26, David Lee Murphy's "Just Once" at no. 36, Reba McEntire's "If I Had Only Known" at no. 72, and Brooks & Dunn's "Ride 'em High, Ride 'em Low" at no. 73. Of these songs, "If I Had Only Known" previously appeared on McEntire's 1991 album For My Broken Heart, while "Just Once" later appeared on Murphy's debut album Out with a Bang. "Burnin' Up the Road", performed here by John Anderson, was previously the title track to McBride & the Ride's 1991 debut album.

Critical reception

Scott Neal Wilson of Country Weekly gave the soundtrack a positive review, saying that its sound would "not only appeal to country fans[…]but also to a pop-rock audience pulled in by the movie's inspirational storyline." Giving the album 2  stars out of 5, Jim Ridley of New Country magazine wrote that "While each of the tracks is agreeable in its own right, together they're like a radio station you can't escape. When you hear a good track, you want to hear more from that artist; when you hear a dull track, you have no guarantee the next one won't be as lame." He praised the performances of John Anderson and Brooks & Dunn as the strongest.

Track listing

Charts

Weekly charts

Year-end charts

Certifications

References

1994 soundtrack albums
MCA Records soundtracks
Country music soundtracks